Sheliff Basin Berber is a variety of the Berber languages that is spoken in Algeria. It is traditionally taken to be a dialect of Shenwa, one of the Western Algerian
Zenati languages. Blench (2006) argues instead that the variety is part of the Riffian dialect cluster.

See also
Chelif River for which Sheliff is an alternative spelling.

References

Berber languages
Extinct languages of Africa
Riff languages

br:Tidikelteg
hr:Tidikelt tamazight (jezik)